Mokheti Matsora is a Mosotho footballer who currently plays as a striker for LMPS Maseru. Since 2009, he has won two caps for the Lesotho national football team.

External links
 

Living people
Association football forwards
Lesotho footballers
Lesotho international footballers
Year of birth missing (living people)